Cipriano de Valera (1531–1602) was a Spanish Protestant Reformer and refugee who edited the first major revision of Casiodoro de Reina's Spanish Bible, which has become known as the Reina-Valera version. Valera also edited an edition of Calvin's Institutes in Spanish, as well as writing and editing several other works.

Biography

Early life and conversion 

Valera was born at Fregenal de la Sierra about 100 kilometres north of Seville. He was a student for about six years at the University of Seville studying Dialectics and Philosophy, where he was influenced by the sermons of Giles of Viterbo amongst others. After graduation, Valera became a monk in the Order of the Hieronymites and lived at the Monastery of San Isidoro, where he adopted the surname 'de Valera', this being the Hieronymite practice.  Owing to the influence of the Reformation in nearby Seville, Valera and most of the other monks at San Isidoro accepted reformist teaching with twenty-two of the forty monks in the monastery being accused of heresy. In spite of the dangers, twelve of them fled to Geneva, including Casiodoro de Reina and Antonio del Corro as well as Valera himself. Of those that remained, forty were burned to death in autos-da-fé by 1562; Valera was tried in absentia and his effigy was burned at the stake.

Geneva and England 

Valera first went to Geneva, where he was influenced by the work of John Calvin, before travelling to England upon the accession of Elizabeth I in 1559. In that same year, Valera was made a professor of Theology at the University of Cambridge and became a Fellow of Magdalene College, where his compatriot Francisco de Enzinas had held a fellowship before Marian persecutions. Later, in 1565, the University of Oxford also granted him an M.A.

In 1567, Valera moved to London to serve as the minister of the Church of St Mary Axe, a Stranger church which housed a congregation of Spanish Protestant refugees and where Reina had previously been pastor. Valera also frequently travelled to Amsterdam to support the Reformation there.

Death 

The year of Valera's death is unknown, with the publication of the Reina-Valera Bible in 1602 being the last known date in his life.

Writings 

In 1559, Valera assisted with the writing of the Spanish Confession of London along with Reina and others, which sought to stress the theological orthodoxy of the Spanish and Italian Protestant communities in London, in response to the writings of Michael Servetus and Sebastian Castellio on the Trinity.

After the failure of the Spanish Armada, Valera started to write several works himself, seemingly being patronized to do so. The earliest was The Two Treatises on the Pope and on the Mass (1588), the first original Spanish work to be printed in England, in which he criticized elements of the Roman Catholic practice of the Mass as paganistic, and argued that if the Spanish could better understand the Bible they would be able to challenge the claimed authority of the Papacy. Others works included A Treatise for the Purpose of Confirming in their Christian Faith the Captives of the Barbary Pirates (1594), which reflects his evangelistic work among seamen and prisoners, although it has been suggested that the captives represent Spanish Christians and the 'Barbary Pirates' the clergy of the Roman Catholic Church. Later in his life, in 1597, Valera translated Calvin's Institutes.

Most famously, however, over a twenty-year period Valera amended Reina's 1569 translation of the Bible into the Spanish vernacular and travelled to Leiden in 1602 with a printer to present the first copy to Maurice of Nassau and the States General of the Netherlands, from where it was published.

In response to these various works, Valera was listed in the Index Librorum Prohibitorum and called "el hereje español" ("the Spanish heretic") par excellence.

Personal life 

In 1564, Valera married an Englishwoman, with whom he had one daughter, Judith, who married Thomas Kingsmill, the Regius Professor of Hebrew at the University of Oxford, and had issue.

Quotations 

"Therefore, open your eyes, O Spaniards, and forsaking those who deceive you, obey Christ and His Word which alone is firm and unchangeable for ever. Establish and found your faith on the true foundation of the Prophets and Apostles and sole Head of His Church"

Introduction to Valera's translation of Calvin's Institutes, 1597

"The reason for my motivation in making this edition, was the same that motivated Casiodoro de Reina, who had been motivated by that hallowed Person, the Lord Himself. He desired to proclaim the glory of God and to make a clear service to his nation. Therefore, he began to translate the Holy Bible (into Spanish)"

Introduction to the Reina-Valera Bible, 1602

See also
 Bible translations

References

Bibliography

External links
 
 
 Text of the Reina–Valera (1602)

1530s births
1600 deaths
People from the Province of Badajoz
Spanish Protestants
Spanish emigrants to the Kingdom of England
Spanish translators
Translators of the Bible into Spanish
University of Seville alumni
Fellows of Magdalene College, Cambridge